Rene Fortaleza (born 30 October 1954) is a Filipino boxer. He competed in the men's flyweight event at the 1972 Summer Olympics. At the 1972 Summer Olympics, he lost to Fujio Nagai of Japan.

References

1954 births
Living people
Filipino male boxers
Olympic boxers of the Philippines
Boxers at the 1972 Summer Olympics
Place of birth missing (living people)
Boxers at the 1978 Asian Games
Asian Games competitors for the Philippines
Flyweight boxers